Juan Luna Eslava (born 15 September 1964) is a Spanish retired footballer who played as a central defender, and current assistant coach.

Playing career
Born in Fernán Núñez, Córdoba, Andalusia, Luna Eslava made his debuts as a senior with Fernán Núñez CF. He only played amateur football during his whole career, representing Córdoba CF (two stints), Recreativo de Huelva, Cádiz CF, Montilla CF, Écija Balompié and CD Pozoblanco.

Post-playing career
After a year as a youth coordinator, Luna Eslava was an assistant of Paco Jémez at his former club Córdoba, and remained in the same role with the following manager, José González. On 8 December 2008 he was appointed first team manager, after the latter was dismissed.

In April 2010 Luna Eslava was named Jémez's assistant UD Las Palmas. He left the club in February of the following year, and returned to his main club Córdoba in June, as a director of football.

References

External links

Stats and bio at Cadistas1910 

1964 births
Living people
Sportspeople from the Province of Córdoba (Spain)
Spanish footballers
Footballers from Andalusia
Association football defenders
Segunda División B players
Tercera División players
Córdoba CF players
Recreativo de Huelva players
Cádiz CF players
Écija Balompié players
Spanish football managers
Córdoba CF managers
People from Campiña Sur (Córdoba)